Tunuyán is a city in the west of the province of Mendoza, Argentina, located on the western shore of the Tunuyán River,  south from the provincial capital Mendoza and  east of the Chilean border. It has 49,132 inhabitants, and is the head town of the Tunuyán Department. Along with the Tupungato Department and the San Carlos Department it makes up the "Valle de Uco" region, which is famous in the Argentine wine industry for its important and modern vineyards and wineries. Investments since the millennium, attracted by the climate, soil, and altitude combination, have transformed the area, making it one of Argentina's most important regions when it comes to high-quality wine production and its associated connoisseur-driven enotourism.

Notable residents
 Carlos Alonso (born in Tunuyán)
 Nicolino Locche

References

 Municipality of Tunuyán — Official website.
 
 Guide of Tunuyán.

Populated places in Mendoza Province
Populated places established in 1880
1880 establishments in Argentina
Cities in Argentina
Argentina
Mendoza Province